Limonene synthase may refer to one of two enzymes:
(R)-limonene synthase
(4S)-limonene synthase